Faiez Jacobs (born 12 January 1973) is a South African politician who serves as a Member of the National Assembly of South Africa for the ruling African National Congress (ANC). He took office as an MP on 22 May 2019. Jacobs was the Secretary of the provincial ANC in the Western Cape from 2015 until the dissolution of the provincial structure in 2019.

References

External links
Faiez Jacobs – People's Assembly
Faiez Jacobs – Parliament of South Africa

Living people
1973 births
Members of the National Assembly of South Africa
People from the Western Cape
Politicians from the Western Cape
Politicians from Cape Town
Coloured South African people
21st-century South African politicians